The Luc Robitaille Trophy is awarded to the team with the best goals for average during the regular season in the Quebec Major Junior Hockey League. The trophy is named after Luc Robitaille, who played three QMJHL seasons with the Hull Olympiques in the 1980s. Before 2015, the Trophy was awarded to the team that scored the most goals during the regular season.

Winners

Best goals for average

Most goals scored

External links
 QMJHL official site List of trophy winners.

Quebec Major Junior Hockey League trophies and awards